Dr. John J. Berger (born May 8, 1945 in New York City) is an American author and environmental consultant. He has worked for the National Research Council of the National Academy of Sciences, Fortune 500 corporations such as Lockheed Corporation and Chevron, nonprofit groups, such as Friends of the Earth and the Sierra Club, and governmental organizations, including the Office of Technology Assessment of the United States Congress. He co-founded and directed the Nuclear Information and Resource Service as well as Restoring the Earth. Berger has authored and edited ten books on energy and environmental issues, including Climate Peril: The Intelligent Reader's Guide to Understanding the Climate Crisis, Climate Myths: The Campaign Against Climate Science, Restoring the Earth: How Americans Are Working to Renew Our Damaged Environment, and Charging Ahead: The Business of Renewable Energy and What It Means for America.

Biography
Berger is a long-time supporter of alternative energy solutions to global environmental problems.  He has repeatedly called attention to the nation's excessive dependence on foreign oil and the huge economic and environmental costs, and risks.  He has outlined strategies for a clean, renewable energy economy in his books and articles which have appeared in publications such as Huffington Post, Scientific American, The Boston Globe, The Christian Science Monitor, The Los Angeles Times, Huffington Post, and Renewable Energy World. Berger's writing on energy and natural resource issues has helped to launch the environmental restoration movement, beginning with his book Restoring the Earth in 1985.

Education and Work
In 1966, John J. Berger earned a Bachelor of Arts in Political Science from Stanford University. Prior to his work on energy and the environment, Berger was an innovator in journalism.  In 1970, he co-founded Alternative Features Service, Inc. to support the development of alternative and college newspapers and radio stations in the U.S. with syndicated press materials that especially highlighted the creation of alternative institutions, such as free clinics, people's banks, free universities, and alternative housing.  

In 1976, after publishing his first book, Nuclear Power: The Unviable Option, with an introduction by Nobel Laureate Dr. Linus Pauling and a foreword by Senator Mike Gravel, he was invited by David Brower to become Friends of the Earth's Energy Projects Director in San Francisco.: Just a few years later, in 1979, he became a technical editor at the Lawrence Berkeley National Laboratory in Berkeley, California. The next year, Berger was awarded an MA in Energy and Natural Resources from the University of California, Berkeley. In 1980 and 1981, Berger taught courses in energy technology and policy at Vista College and the University of San Francisco. In 1984, Berger began two years of postgraduate research on land-use policy in Sacramento at the University of California, Davis. In 1985, he published Restoring the Earth: How Americans Are Working to Restore Our Damaged Environment and became the executive director of Restoring the Earth, an environmental organization based in Berkeley, California. Berger then went on to receive a PhD in Ecology from the University of California, Davis in 1990 and served as visiting Associate Professor of Environmental Policy at the Graduate School of Public Affairs of the University of Maryland and Professor of Environmental Science at the University of San Francisco. 

His awards include: a Switzer Foundation Environmental Fellowship for graduate study, a year-long fellowship for study at the University of Tunis in Tunisia, a summer writing fellowship at the Blue Mountain Center in the Adirondacks; and selection to participate in a summer-study program at the Roscoe B. Jackson Memorial Laboratory for Genetic Research. Berger is also an independent energy and environmental consultant. He is currently (2016) an Affiliated Research Fellow at UC Berkeley's Renewable and Appropriate Energy Laboratory.

Bibliography

Books

Published Print Articles (Non-Digital)

Notes/Further reading

References

External links

Nuclear Information and Resource Service
Solar-Energy Update: Good News about Solar Energy & Energy-Efficiency

American male writers
Stanford University alumni
American ecologists
Writers from New York City
1945 births
Living people
University of California, Berkeley alumni
University of California, Davis alumni
Scientists from New York (state)